Rick Staples (born March 12, 1970) is an American politician who served as a member of the Tennessee House of Representatives from 2017 to 2020. A Democrat, he represented District 15, which includes parts of the city of Knoxville.

Early life and education
Staples attended Holston High School in Knoxville, and the University of Tennessee. He is an account executive.

Career
Staples was elected in 2016, succeeding Joe Armstrong, who had been convicted of a felony for a false tax return the previous August, and was thus ineligible to run for reelection.

Staples has served on multiple committees, including the Commerce Committee, Banking & Investments Subcommittee, Finance, Ways, & Means Committee, Finance, Ways, & Means Subcommittee, State Committee, Departments & Agencies Subcommittee, Joint Pensions and Insurance Committee.

Personal life
Staples is currently single, and has four children. He is a Baptist.

References

1970 births
Politicians from Knoxville, Tennessee
Democratic Party members of the Tennessee House of Representatives
21st-century American politicians
Living people
University of Tennessee alumni
African-American state legislators in Tennessee
21st-century African-American politicians
20th-century African-American people